The A. G. Leventis Professorship of Greek Culture is the first professorship in Classics to have been endowed at Cambridge University since World War II, and Trinity College Dublin since 2017. Its purpose is to focus on the study of more than 1,000 years of Greek cultural achievements and to highlight the lasting influence they continue to have on society today.

The chair was endowed by a donation of £2.361 million from the Cyprus-based Leventis Foundation, which was established in 1979 as a result of provisions made by Anastasios George Leventis, with the aim of supporting educational, cultural, artistic and philanthropic causes with an emphasis on Greek and Cypriot cultural heritage

List of A. G. Leventis Professors of Greek Culture

Cambridge University
2008 Paul Cartledge
2014 Tim Whitmarsh

Dublin University
2019 Ahuvia Kahane

References

External links
'Forever Young: why Cambridge has a Professorship of Greek Culture'  An inaugural lecture by Professor Paul Cartledge to mark the establishment of the A G Leventis Professorship of Greek Culture, Monday 16 February 2009 at Mill Lane Lecture Theatre, Cambridge
Forward To The Past! Hello To Democracy, Sparta, And All That  A valedictory lecture by The AG Leventis Professor Of Greek Culture, Professor Paul Cartledge, Thursday 20 February 2014 at Mill Lane Lecture Theatre, Cambridge

Greek Culture, Leventis, A. G.}
Faculty of Classics, University of Cambridge
Greek Culture, Leventis, A. G., Cambridge}
2008 establishments in England